This list of bridges in Hungary lists bridges of particular historical, scenic, architectural or engineering interest. Road and railway bridges, viaducts, aqueducts and footbridges are included.

Major road and railway bridges 
This table presents the structures with spans greater than 100 meters (non-exhaustive list).

Notes and references 
 

 

 Others references

See also 

 Bridges of Budapest
 List of crossings of the Danube
 Transport in Hungary
 Highways in Hungary
 Rail transport in Hungary
 Geography of Hungary

External links

Further reading 
 
 
 

Hungary
 
Bridges
Bridges